Höör (formerly spelled Hör, old ) is a locality and the seat of Höör Municipality, Skåne County, Sweden with 7,865 inhabitants in 2010.

Name
The town was previously known as Hørg (in the 12th century), Hørgh (in the 15th century), and later Hør and Hör. The present, unusual spelling with double "ö" was implemented by the Swedish postal service at the beginning of the 20th century. At that time, it was a common practice in Sweden to write  (for here) in the address of letters to be delivered within the same town. In order to avoid confusion between letters to be delivered locally and those intended for Hör, the postal service changed the town's name to Höör.

Transport 

Höör railway station is located on the northern side of the town and a five-minute walk into the central square. It is on the line between Kristianstad and Malmö, where there are frequent commuter trains running beyond Sweden to Copenhagen in Denmark.

The following services call at this station (incomplete):

 Regional train (Øresundståg Regional): Karlskrona – Kristianstad – Hässleholm – Höör – Lund – Malmö – Copenhagen Airport (København Lufthavn/Kastrup) – Copenhagen Central (København H) – Østerport – Helsingør
 Regional train (Skånetrafiken Express): Alvesta – Hässleholm – Höör – Eslöv – Lund – Malmö
 Regional train (Skånetrafiken Regional): Höör – Eslöv – Lund – Malmö – Ystad – Simrishamn

References 

Municipal seats of Skåne County
Swedish municipal seats
Populated places in Höör Municipality
Populated places in Skåne County
20th-century establishments in Skåne County